Holystone is a sandstone used for scrubbing and whitening the wooden decks of ships.

Holystone may also refer to:

 Holystone, Northumberland, a village in England (near Rothbury)
 Holystone, Tyne and Wear, a village in England (near Whitley Bay)

See also
 Holystone Slope, a glacier in Antarctica